Diasporus is a genus of frogs in the family Eleutherodactylidae. The genus was first described in 2008. They are found in Central and northern South America. They are sometimes referred to as dink frogs, in reference to the "tink" sound that males make during the mating season.

Characteristics
They have a relatively large, distinct head. All members have direct development, skipping a tadpole stage. The male advertisement call is either a "whistle" or a "tink" (or "dink"), depending on the species.

Etymology
The name is from the Greek diaspora ("a dispersion from"). It refers to the relationship of this genus to the Caribbean clade of Eleutherodactylus.

Distribution
Diasporus spp. inhabit humid lowland and montane forests from eastern Honduras through Panama to the Pacific versant of Colombia and northwestern Ecuador.

Species
The following species are recognised in the genus Diasporus:

References

External links

 
Eleutherodactylinae
Amphibian genera
Amphibians of Central America
Amphibians of South America
Taxa named by William Edward Duellman
Taxa named by Stephen Blair Hedges